Kristinne Grigoryan (Armenian: Քրիստինե Գրիգորյան, born on August 27, 1981, Sevan, Armenian Soviet Socialist Republic, USSR) is an Armenian lawyer and a former deputy minister of justice who has also served as the Human Rights Ombudsman of the Republic of Armenia.

Biogpraphy 
Kristinne Grigoryan was born on August 27, 1981 in the town of Sevan. From 1998 until 2002, she studied at the Department of Oriental Studies, Yerevan State University (YSU), receiving her Bachelor's degree. In 2006, she received her Master's degree from the same department. In 2008, Grigoryan graduated from the Northern University's Law Department.

Career 
From 2004 until 2009, Grigoryan worked for the Staff of National Assembly of Armenia in the capacity of a specialist at the Department of Legislative Analysis and Development. From March to October 2009, she was a translator-lawyer for the NA Department of External Relations. Between 2009-2011, Grigoryan served as a Legal Aide to the Chief of Staff of the National Assembly. An aide to a member of parliament (2011-2014) and an Assistant to the NA Chairman on legal affairs (2012-2014), she led a team  as part of the USAID-funded program "Support to the Development of Institutional Capacities of the National Assembly of Armenia" between 2014-2015. From 2025 until 2018, Grigoryan headed the Department of International Legal Cooperation at the staff of the Ministry of Justice. After the Velvet Revolution of Armenia in 2018, she served as an advisor to Ararat Mirzoyan, the First Deputy Prime Minister at the time. On 3 July 2018, Grigoryan was appointed a deputy minister of justice by the prime minister's decision. 

On 24 January 2022, the National Assembly elected her as the Human Rights Defender of Armenia. She stepped down from office on 23 January 2023, citing promotion to a new office as the reason behind her decision.

References 

Armenian lawyers
1981 births
Living people